Caner Cindoruk (born 17 April 1980) is a Turkish actor and theatre director. He is best known series for period series "Hanımın Çiftliği", "Sadakatsiz", "Kadın" and family comedy drama series "Aramızda Kalsın".

Life and career 
Caner Cindoruk was born on 17 April 1980 in Adana. His maternal family is of Yörük and paternal family is of Kurdish origin. His mother is Müşerref, and his father is the story writer Zafer Doruk, a two times recipient of Orhan Kemal Story Award. He has two siblings, Münir Can Cindoruk and Taner Cindoruk, and first became interested in theater under the influence of his family. His uncle, Erdal Cindoruk, is a theater actor. Cindoruk's childhood years were spent in the backstage of theaters. During his secondary and high school years, he always found a piece on the stage, and took part in various plays during his university years. He is a graduate of Çukurova University, Department of Business Administration. His first professional role was the character of Yusuf on the play Fehim Paşa Konağı. In 1997, he made his professional debut at the Adana Seyhan Municipality Theater Group. He worked as an actor at the Seyhan Municipality and Adana City Theater for ten years. In 2006, he moved to Istanbul with four of his childhood friends. In 2012, together with Ebru Özkan, he appeared in the play Pandaların Hikayesi. 
Caner Cindoruk portrayed the character of Tulumbacı Eğrikapılı Ali in the musical İstanbulname, produced by Türker İnanoğlu. He shared the leading role with Nükhet Duru, Pelin Akil, Cezmi Baskın and Kayhan Yıldızoğlu.

Television Career
In 2007, with his role on Kara Güneş he had his first television experience. 

He played in Yaprak Dökümü which based from classic novel. His portrayal of the character Doctor Nazmi in Yaprak Dökümü earned him critical acclaim. 

In the summer of 2009, Cindoruk was cast in an adaptation of one of Orhan Kemal's  classic works, titled Hanımın Çiftliği, and acted opposite Mehmet Aslantuğ and Özgü Namal.

In 2016, Cindoruk and Gizem Karaca were cast as the leading roles of the series İstanbul Sokakları.

With Özge Özpirinçci, he played together in series "Kadın" and "Aramızda Kalsın".

He played the character of 'Volkan Arslan' in the TV series Sadakatsiz, the Turkish adaptation of the English-made Doctor Foster series broadcast on Kanal D, in which he shared the lead role with Cansu Dere and Melis Sezen from 2020 to 2022.

Film Career
He had his cinematic debut in the same year with a role in the movie Beynelmilel. His cast-mates included the actor Özgü Namal. In 2008, Cindoruk appeared in the movie Kelebek. The next year he appeared in the film Geç Gelen Bahar. He was cast in Bahman Ghobadi's Gergedan Mevsimi alongside Yılmaz Erdoğan, Beren Saat and Monica Bellucci. In 2015, he appeared in Iraqi director Hiner Saleem's movie, Dar Elbise, alongside Tuba Büyüküstün, Hazar Ergüçlü, İnanç Konukçu, Devrim Yakut and Canan Ergüder. The movie was released in 2016. 
With his role in Zeki Demirkubuz's movie Kor, Caner Cindoruk received critical acclaim from critics. His cast-mates in the movie were Aslıhan Gürbüz and Taner Birsel.

Filmography

References

External links 
IMDb profile

1980 births
People from Adana
Çukurova University alumni
Turkish male television actors
Turkish male film actors
Turkish male stage actors
Turkish people of Kurdish descent
Living people